Thomas Knight (ca. 1701 – 26 February 1781) previously Thomas Brodnax (1701–1726) and Thomas May (1727–1738),  of Godmersham Park, Kent, was an English landowner and Tory politician who sat in the House of Commons from 1734 to 1741.

Early life
 Knight was the son of William Brodnax of Godmersham, Kent and his second wife Anne May, daughter of Christopher May of Greenwich. He matriculated at Balliol College, Oxford on 2 June 1720, aged 18.  In 1726, he succeeded his father to the family estate at Godmersham. Also in 1726, he succeeded his cousin Dame Anne May to the May estates at Rawmere, Sussex and changed his name by a 1726 Act of Parliament to May. He married Jane Monke, daughter of William Monke  of Buckingham House, Shoreham at Grey's Inn Chapel on 11 July 1729. In 1732 he rebuilt the house at Godmersham. He served as Sheriff of Kent for 1729.

Career
As May, he was elected Tory Member of Parliament (MP) for Canterbury at the 1734 British general election. He voted with the Opposition and did not stand at the 1741 British general election. In 1738, he changed his name by Act of Parliament to Knight after inheriting the Chawton estates under the will of Elizabeth Knight, widow of Bulstrode Knight (who was her second husband, her first being William Woodrow Knight of Dean).

Later life and legacy

Knight retired to his seat at Godmersham and in 1742 he enclosed a park round it. He died at Godmersham in 1781. Although he and his wife had five sons and five daughters, only three daughters and a son survived. His son Thomas inherited the estate and was later MP for Kent.

Knight was described as "a gentleman, whose eminent worth is still remembered by many now living; whose high character for upright conduct and integrity, rendered his life as honorable as it was good, and caused his death to be lamented by every one as a public loss".

References

1700s births
1781 deaths
British MPs 1734–1741
Members of the Parliament of Great Britain for English constituencies
Year of birth uncertain
High Sheriffs of Kent
People from Godmersham